Jukun may refer to:

 Jukun Takum language, a Jukunoid language of Cameroon used as a trade language in Nigeria
 Jukun Wapan language or Wukari, a major Jukunoid language of Nigeria
 Jukun Wurkum language or Jiba, a Jukunoid language of Nigeria
 Djugun language, an Australian Aboriginal language of Western Australia

See also
 Jukunoid languages, languages spoken by the Jukun and related peoples of Nigeria and Cameroon
 Jukun (disambiguation)